Leland Judd Barrows (October 27, 1906 – March 3, 1988) was an American ambassador to Cameroon and Togo. He was born in Hutchinson, Kansas. He married Mabel Irene Conley on  March 21, 1935.

He served various diplomatic positions including a member of the Council on Foreign Relations; Phi Beta Kappa and foreign service officer; along with his ambassadorships; as well as a Newspaper reporter and radio broadcaster outside of the State Department. He died in 1988.

His parents were Eugene Barrows and Florence Emma (Judd) Barrows.

Education
He graduated from the University of Kansas with a master's degree in political science.

Career
Narrows has had a varied career in government. While Harry Truman was president, he served in the Office of Price Administration, the Federal Public Housing Authority, and the Department of State, 1944–48; Executive Assistant to the Special, Representative in Europe, Economic Cooperation Administration, 1948–53; Director, Mission to Greece, Foreign Operations Agency, 1952–54; and Mission to Vietnam, 1949–1958.

Personal life 
Barrows was married to Irene Conley Barrows, with whom he had two children. His son, Leland C. Barrows, was a graduate of Columbia University and served as a history professor at Voorhees College.

References

1906 births
1988 deaths
Ambassadors of the United States to Togo
Ambassadors of the United States to Cameroon
People from Hutchinson, Kansas
University of Kansas alumni